Joint Strike Fighter is a 1997 combat flight simulator designed by Innerloop Studios and published by Eidos Interactive. Innerloop produced the game chiefly to be a showcase for their cutting edge game engine, which they planned to license to other game developers. The game engine was later adapted to Project I.G.I..

Gameplay
The game lets the player assume the role of wing commander of an unnamed western alliance campaigning in four different (fictional) war scenarios taking place in Afghanistan, Colombia, Korea, and the Kola Peninsula. The player may pilot either of the two prototype multi-role combat aircraft that contended in the Joint Strike Fighter Program:  the Lockheed Martin X-35 (later selected for production) and the Boeing X-32. The player is accompanied in air combat by up to three AI-controlled wingmen. Alternatively, the player can engage in pure dogfighting against either the computer or human opponents through online multiplayer and spawn installation modes.

References

External links

1997 video games
Combat flight simulators
Eidos Interactive games
Multiplayer and single-player video games
Video games developed in Norway
Video games set in Afghanistan
Video games set in Korea
Video games set in Russia
Video games set in South America
Windows games
Windows-only games